Orbellia is a genus of flies in the family Heleomyzidae. There are about 13 described species in Orbellia.

Species
These 13 species belong to the genus Orbellia:

O. amurensis Gorodkov, 1972 c g
O. barbata (Garrett, 1921) i c g b
O. borisregis Czerny, 1930 c g
O. cuniculorum (Robineau-Desvoidy, 1830) c g
O. hiemalis (Loew, 1862) i c g
O. montana Gorodkov, 1972 c g
O. myiopiformis Robineau-Desvoidy, 1830 c g
O. nivicola (Frey, 1913) c g
O. obscura Gorodkov, 1972 c g
O. petersoni (Malloch, 1916) i c g b
O. tetrachaeta Gorodkov, 1972 c g
O. tokyoensis Czerny, 1937 c g
O. zaitzevi Gorodkov, 1972 c g

Data sources: i = ITIS, c = Catalogue of Life, g = GBIF, b = Bugguide.net

References

Further reading

 

Heleomyzidae
Articles created by Qbugbot
Taxa named by Jean-Baptiste Robineau-Desvoidy
Sphaeroceroidea genera